The Committee for the Liberation of Iraq (CLI) was a non-governmental organization which described itself as a "distinguished group of Americans" who wanted to "free Iraq from Saddam Hussein".

History
The organization was founded in 2002. In a news release announcing its formation, the group said its goal was to "promote regional peace, political freedom and international security through replacement of the Saddam Hussein regime with a democratic government that respects the rights of the Iraqi people and ceases to threaten the community of nations." It had close links to the Project for the New American Century (PNAC) and the American Enterprise Institute (AEI), important shapers of the Bush administration's foreign policy.

The Washington Post reported in November 2002 that "the organization is modeled on a successful lobbying campaign to expand the NATO alliance. Members include former secretary of state George P. Shultz, Sen. John McCain (R-Ariz.) and former senator Bob Kerrey (D-Neb.). ... While the Iraq committee is an independent entity, committee officers said they expect to work closely with the administration. They already have met with Hadley and Bush political adviser Karl Rove. Committee officers and a White House spokesman said Rice, Hadley and Cheney will soon meet with the group."

With the successful removal of Saddam Hussein, the committee appears to have disbanded, and its once-prominent website no longer exists. However, its offices still remain on Pennsylvania Avenue and 10th Street.

Personnel 
Randy Scheunemann, CLI's executive director, former chief national-security adviser to U.S. Senator Trent Lott, has also worked for Donald Rumsfeld as a consultant on Iraq policy. While working for Lott in 1998, Scheunemann drafted the "Iraq Liberation Act" that authorized $98 million for the Iraqi National Congress. 
Evan Bayh, U.S. Senator (honorary co-chair) 
Bruce P. Jackson, chairman, is the former vice president of weapons contractor Lockheed Martin. He also chaired the Republican Party Platform's subcommittee for National Security and Foreign Policy when George W. Bush ran for president in 2000.
Jonathan Pallant, Exeter University

Advisory board
Mahdi Al-Bassam, Iraq Liberation Action Committee
Barry Blechman, DFI International, Co-founder of the Henry L. Stimson Center
Eliot Cohen, Johns Hopkins School of Advanced International Studies
Thomas A. Dine, Radio Free Europe/Radio Liberty, former Director of the American Israel Public Affairs Committee pro-Israel lobbying group
General Wayne Downing, U.S. Army (retired), has been a lobbyist for the Iraqi National Congress
Rend al-Rahim Francke, Iraq Foundation
Newt Gingrich, former Speaker of the U.S. House of Representatives
Lt. General Buster Glosson, U.S. Air Force (retired)
James P. Hoffa, International Brotherhood of Teamsters
Howell Jackson, Professor of Law, Harvard Law School
Robert Kerrey, former U.S. presidential candidate
Jeane J. Kirkpatrick, American Enterprise Institute
William Kristol, The Weekly Standard, chairman of the Project for the New American Century
Bernard Lewis, Princeton University
Joseph Lieberman, U.S. senator (honorary co-chair)
General Barry McCaffrey, U.S. Army (retired); former U.S. "drug czar"
John McCain, U.S. senator (honorary co-chair)
Will Marshall, Progressive Policy Institute
Richard Perle, former Assistant Secretary of Defense, co-founder of the Project for the New American Century
Danielle Pletka, American Enterprise Institute
Gary Schmitt, executive director of the Project for the New American Century
George P. Shultz, Secretary of State under Ronald Reagan
Richard Shultz, The Fletcher School of Law and Diplomacy
Steve Solarz, former congressman
Ruth Wedgwood, Johns Hopkins School of Advanced International Studies
Leon Wieseltier, The New Republic
Chris Williams, Johnston and Associates 
R. James Woolsey, former CIA Director

International advisory board

Carl Bildt, former Prime Minister of Sweden

References

External links 
Committee for the Liberation of Iraq (archived website 2003)

Foreign policy political advocacy groups in the United States
Iraq–United States relations
Causes and prelude of the Iraq War
Organizations established in 2002
Organizations disestablished in 2003